Catch Me may refer to:

Catch Me!, a 1963 album by jazz guitarist Joe Pass
 "Catch Me" (Jeri Lynne Fraser song), a 1960 song written by Sid Tepper and Roy C. Bennett and covered by Cliff Richard
 "Catch Me (I'm Falling)", a 1987 song by Pretty Poison
 "Catch Me", a song by Demi Lovato from her album Here We Go Again (Demi Lovato album)
 Catch Me (album), a 2012 album by TVXQ
 *"Catch Me" (TVXQ song), 2012
 "Catch Me", a 2015 song by Yellow Claw & Flux Pavilion from Yellow Claw's album, Blood For Mercy
 Steal My Heart (film), a South Korean film also known as Catch Me